"After We Go" is a song written and recorded by the American rock band Tantric. The song was released as the third and final single from the band's 2004 second album of the same name (After We Go). Though the song was released as a single no cover artwork is known to exist, the song peaked six spots higher than their previously released single "The Chain" peaking at number 30 on the Billboard US Mainstream Rock charts.

Charts

References

2004 singles
2004 songs
Tantric (band) songs
Maverick Records singles
Songs written by Hugo Ferreira
Songs written by Jesse Vest
Songs written by Todd Whitener
Songs written by Matt Taul